Sankt Stefan im Rosental is a municipality in the district of Südoststeiermark in the Austrian state of Styria.

People 
 Johann Lafer (born 1957), Austrian chef

Population

References

External links 
 www.st.stefan.at - town website

Cities and towns in Südoststeiermark District